The Government Degree College, Kulgam (Urdu;) also known as GDC Kulgam  is the University of Kashmir affiliated autonomous co-educational degree college located in Kulgam in the Indian union territory of Jammu and Kashmir. It is one of the premier learning of higher education in South Kashmir. The college is recognized by the University Grants Commission, under sections 2(f) and 12(b) of UGC Act, 1956.

Location
Govt.

Establishment
Govt. of Jammu and Kashmir established the college under the Chief-Ministership of Mufti Mohammad Sayeed in the year 2004.

Courses offered
The college offers various bachelor courses.

Bachelor of Arts (BA)
Bachelor of Science (Medical)
Bachelor of Science (Non-Medical)
Bachelor of Commerce (B.Com.)
Bachelor of Business Administration (BBA)
•Bachelor of Computer Applications(BCA)

References

Degree colleges in Kashmir Division
Universities and colleges in Jammu and Kashmir
University of Kashmir
2004 establishments in Jammu and Kashmir
Educational institutions established in 2004
Colleges affiliated to University of Kashmir